Ten athletes from the United Kingdom of Great Britain and Ireland competed in seven sports at the 1896 Summer Olympics. The Great Britain athletes were the fifth most successful in terms of overall medals (7) and tied for fifth in gold medals (2).  The 7 medals came on 23 entries in 14 events.

Two tennis players (one English, one Irish) also played in mixed team squads, contributing to a gold and a bronze medal. These medals are not counted as part of the Great Britain total.

Medallists

Medals awarded to participants of mixed-NOC teams are represented in italics. These medals are not counted towards the individual NOC medal tally.

Multiple medalists
The following competitors won multiple medals at the 1896 Olympic Games.

Competitors

| width=78% align=left valign=top |
The following is the list of number of competitors in the Games.

| width="22%" align="left" valign="top" |

Athletics

Track & road events

Field events

Cycling

Track

Road

Gymnastics

Individual

Fencing

Shooting

Merlin and Machonet were unable to win any medals in the shooting events.

Swimming

Tennis

Boland (later best known as an Irish nationalist politician) was by far the best player in the tennis competition, amassing a 6-0 record over both events and two gold medals, though one of them was as part of a mixed team. He defeated Traun in the first round of the singles competition, then teamed up with him for the doubles competition. Robertson was much less successful, losing both of the matches he played, though he was awarded a retroactive bronze medal by the International Olympic Committee as his bye in the doubles quarterfinals put him in third place in that event. Like Boland's doubles gold medal, Robertson's bronze is not counted as part of the British total because the two played on mixed teams. Some sources include George Marshall and his brother Frank; the two were entered but appear to have not competed.

Weightlifting

Elliot (born in British India of Scottish ancestry) lifted the same amount as Viggo Jensen in the two handed lift, but was declared by Prince George of Greece to have taken second place based on lifting form. In the one handed lift, he easily defeated Jensen, who lifted only 57 kilograms.

Wrestling

Elliot was defeated by eventual champion Carl Schuhmann in the first round of the wrestling competition, tying for 4th and last place.

References

  (Digitally available at )
  (Excerpt available at )
 

Nations at the 1896 Summer Olympics
1896
Olympics
Olympics